"My President" is the fourth official single from rapper Young Jeezy's third studio album, The Recession. The song also features rapper Nas and is produced by Tha Bizness. This song was number 16 on Rolling Stones list of the 100 Best Songs of 2008. Jeezy and Nas recorded the song on the day Barack Obama clinched the Democratic nomination for the presidency. "My President" is also notable for the unified collaboration between the two artists, who had been having a feud since the 2006 release of Nas' album Hip Hop Is Dead, which contained statements to which Young Jeezy took offense.

Music video
The music video was shot on November 23, 2008, in Atlanta, Georgia, and features many supporters of Barack Obama holding placards with various names written on them including Mother Teresa, Sojourner Truth, Bamir Topi, Sali Berisha, Bernie Mac, Sebastian Edwards, Tupac Shakur, The Notorious B.I.G., Nas, Bun B, Juelz Santana, William Shakespeare, The Game, Lil Boosie, Jam Master Jay, Trick Daddy, David Banner, Akon, Jermaine Dupri, Pimp C and Soulja Slim. Other placards name famous world figures like Mahatma Gandhi and Che Guevara. The placards are meant to evoke those held by delegations at national political conventions; however, Hart elected to also include neighborhoods like Queensbridge and countries like Haiti, Israel and Iraq. The Israel placards caused offense to many Palestinians, including DJ Khaled and Muslims because of the 2008-2009 Gaza War. Young Jeezy bought his Lamborghini Murcielago for the music video in which he raps, "My president is black, my Lambo is blue".

The video was directed by Gabriel Hart. The music video was released on January 16, 2009 in preparation for Obama's inauguration. It ranked at #44 on BET's Notarized: Top 100 Videos of 2009 countdown.

Remixes
The official remix features former Def Jam labelmate Jay-Z, it was leaked on the internet on January 29, 2009. It was mentioned by Jay-Z, who performed his verse live with Jeezy on January 19, 2009 (2:15 am) at Love Nightclub in Washington, D.C. Jay-Z's verse of the remix was released on January 20, 2009, President Obama's inauguration, it was called the "DC Mix". The remix was also produced by Tha Bizness. Jeezy's new verse of the remix is a diss to Bill O'Reilly. This is the second song off the album that has a remix with Jay-Z, the first song was "Put On", the 1st single. The remix is included in the deluxe edition of Jay-Z's compilation album The Hits Collection, Volume One (2010).

Chart positions

Certifications

References

External links

2008 singles
2008 songs
Def Jam Recordings singles
Music videos directed by Gabriel Hart
Nas songs
Song recordings produced by Tha Bizness
Songs about Barack Obama
Songs written by Nas
Songs written by Jeezy
Jeezy songs